Jean Marie Ralph Féthière is a Haitian politician. He is a Senator from the north and a member of the ruling PHTK party. 
On September 23, 2019, while trying to leave Parliament amid a crowd as the government was voting to confirm a new prime minister, Féthière drew a handgun and fired toward the crowd. Chery Dieu-Nalio, a photographer for the Associated Press, suffered injuries to his face from bullet fragments, while a security guard named Leon Leblanc was also injured.

References

Members of the Chamber of Deputies (Haiti)
Living people
Members of the Senate (Haiti)
Year of birth missing (living people)
Haitian Tèt Kale Party politicians
Haitian criminals